Malali  is a village in Bagalkot district, Karnataka, India.

Demographics
As of the 2011 Census of India there were 345 households in Malali and a total population of 1,781 consisting of 912 males and 869 females. There were 177 children ages 0-6.

See also
 Bagalkot
 Districts of Karnataka

References

External links

Villages in Bagalkot district